Brendon Donkers (born 25 July 1976) is a New Zealand cricketer. He played in eight first-class matches for Canterbury from 2002 to 2004.

See also
 List of Canterbury representative cricketers

References

External links
 

1976 births
Living people
New Zealand cricketers
Canterbury cricketers
People from Hokitika